Schayer is a surname. Notable people with the surname include: 

Bobby Schayer (born 1966), American drummer 
Julia Schayer (1842–1928), American writer
Karol Schayer (1900–1971), Polish architect and soldier
Milton Schayer (1876–1935), American businessman
Richard Schayer (1880–1956), American screenwriter
Steven Schayer (born 1965). American guitarist/singer